Michael T. Taussig (born 3 April 1940 in Sydney) is an Australian anthropologist and professor at Columbia University. He is best known for his engagement with Marx's idea of commodity fetishism, especially in terms of the work of Walter Benjamin. Taussig has also published texts on medical anthropology.

He was awarded a Guggenheim Fellowship in 1998 and a Berlin Prize in 2007 from the American Academy in Berlin.

Early life 
Taussig was born in Sydney to parents of German and Czech-Jewish ancestry. He completed his secondary education in 1958 at North Sydney Boys High School. He later earned a medical degree from the University of Sydney as well as a PhD in anthropology at the London School of Economics.

The Devil and Commodity Fetishism (1980)
The Devil and Commodity Fetishism in South America is both a polemic about anthropology and an analysis of a set of seemingly magical beliefs held by rural and urban workers in Colombia and Bolivia. Taussig's polemic is that the principal concern of anthropology should be to critique Western (specifically, capitalist) culture. He further argues that people living in the periphery of the world capitalist economy have a critical vantage point on capitalism, and articulate their critiques of capitalism in terms of their own cultural idioms. He thus concludes that anthropologists should study peoples living on the periphery of the world capitalist economy as a way of gaining critical insight into the anthropologists' own culture. In short, this polemic shifts the anthropologists' object of study from that of other cultures to that of their own, and repositions the former objects of anthropological study (e.g. indigenous peoples) as valued critical thinkers.

Taussig applies this approach to two beliefs: one based on both his own field research and that of anthropologist June Nash, the second based solely on his own research. The first is the belief held by semi-proletarianized peasants in Colombia (with an analogous case among Bolivian tin miners) who proletarianized sugar-cane cutters can make a contract with the devil that will cause them to make a good deal of money, but that this money can be spent only on frivolous consumer goods, and that the cutter will die an early and miserable death. Taussig suggests that earlier anthropologists might have argued that this belief is a hold-over from pre-capitalist culture, or serves as a leveling mechanism (ensuring that no individual become significantly wealthier than any of his or her fellows).  Taussig, however, argues that through the devil, peasants express their recognition that capitalism is based on the magic belief that capital is productive, when in fact capitalism breeds poverty, disease, and death. The second belief provides another example of peasants representing their own understanding of capitalism's claim that capital is productive: the belief that some people engineer a switch that results in a peso, rather than a baby, being baptized.  The consequence is that the money, alive, will return to its original owner no matter how it is spent, and bring more money back with it.

Shamanism, Colonialism, and the Wild Man (1987)
Taussig's seminal work, Shamanism, Colonialism and the Wild Man: A Study in Terror and Healing, examines colonialism as it was carried out in South America. He uses firsthand accounts and his own ethnographic work.

The author begins by studying the rubber trade in the Putumayo river area of Colombia of the late 19th and early 20th century. The British violently pressured the indigenous population, who still lived under an economy based upon gift exchange, to extract rubber from the rubber trees of the area. The barons' reactions to indigenous resistance was to carry out violence the local population, which Taussig documents through providing firsthand accounts from the time.

In his section on healing, Taussig relates his ethnographic work with José García, an Indian shaman of the Putumayo, during the 1970s. He describes how the shaman harnessed the "mystery" and "wildness" projected onto him by the West in his practice as a shaman.

The Nervous System (1992)

Published in 1992, The Nervous System comprises nine essays. Michael Taussig sets out on a journey to explore and describe various forces that shape and mold our present society. He tries to explore the process through which we commodify the state and in that way transfer the power to it. Taussig attempts to show how the state uses forces such as violence or media control to consolidate its power over the people. He argues that we live in a state of emergency, citing Walter Benjamin, that is not 'an exception but the rule.' To show the universality of the nervous system he takes his reader through the heights of Machu Picchu, the world of Cuna shamans, and the pale world of New York's hospital system.

Mimesis and Alterity (1993) 

Mimesis and Alterity looks primarily at the way people from different cultures experience the two themes of the book – how we come to adopt or assimilate another's nature or culture (mimesis), and also how we come to identify/distance ourselves with/from it (alterity). Taussig studies this phenomenon through ethnographical accounts of the Cuna, and through the ideas of Walter Benjamin.

The Cuna have adopted a set of wooden figurines for magical ritual that look remarkably like white colonists, to the point of sometimes being recognizable as figures from history that traveled through those parts. If you asked one of the Cuna about the figurines, he would likely deny all connection between the two, creating an epistemic dilemma where something that may appear obvious to anthropologists is anything but obvious to those they study. Another noteworthy peculiarity of Cuna culture that Taussig mentions is the way in which the Cuna have adopted, in their traditional molas, images from western pop culture, including a distorted reflection of the Jack Daniel's bottle, and also a popular iconic image from the early twentieth century, The Talking Dog, used in advertising gramophones. Taussig criticizes anthropology for reducing the Cuna culture to one in which the Cuna had simply come across the white colonists in the past, were impressed by their large ships and exotic technologies, and mistook them for Gods. For Taussig, this very reduction of the Other is suspect in itself, and through Mimesis and Alterity, he argues from both sides, demonstrating why exactly anthropologists have come to reduce the Cuna culture in this way, and the value of this perspective, at the same time as defending the independence of lived culture from Anthropological reductionism.

Other publications
The Devil and Commodity Fetishism in South America, 1980, .
Shamanism, Colonialism, and the Wild Man: A Study in Terror and Healing, 1987, .
The Nervous System, 1992, .
Mimesis and Alterity: A Particular History of the Senses, 1993, .
The Magic of the State, 1997, .
Defacement: Public Secrecy and the Labor of the Negative, 1999, .
Law in a Lawless Land: Diary of a Limpieza in Colombia, 2003, .
My Cocaine Museum, 2004, . See an excerpt.
Walter Benjamin's Grave, 2006, . See an excerpt.
What Color Is the Sacred?, 2009, . See an excerpt.
I Swear I Saw This: Drawings in Fieldwork Notebooks, Namely My Own, 2011, 
Beauty and the Beast, 2012, 
The Corn Wolf, 2015, 
Mastery of Non-Mastery in the Age of Meltdown, 2020 
 Speak the Wind (2021) Photographs by Hoda Afshar; essay by Michael Taussig.  The photographs document the landscapes and people of the islands of Hormuz, Qeshm, and Hengam, in the Persian Gulf off the south coast of Iran, in which Afshar explores "the idea of being possessed by history". Taussig's essay, entitled Winds of History adds context to the photographs.

References

External links
Taussig Bio page at Columbia University

1940 births
Living people
People educated at North Sydney Boys High School
University of Sydney alumni
Alumni of the London School of Economics
Australian anthropologists
Australian people of Czech-Jewish descent
Australian people of German-Jewish descent
Anthropologists of religion
Jewish anthropologists
Latin Americanists
Columbia University faculty
Australian expatriates in the United Kingdom
Australian expatriates in the United States